Bartovo is a rural locality (a village) in Dubovskoye Rural Settlement, Beryozovsky District, Perm Krai, Russia. The population was 37 as of 2010.

Geography 
Bartovo is located 19 km northwest of  Beryozovka (the district's administrative centre) by road. Fedotovo is the nearest rural locality.

References 

Rural localities in Beryozovsky District, Perm Krai